Jocelyn Donald, also known as "Jozzy", is an American singer-songwriter best known for co-writing "Old Town Road", "Lemonade", "Mr. Right Now" and "Virgo's Groove", among others. In May 2022, Jozzy was announced as the first signee of Diddy's Love Records label imprint.

Discography
 Songs for Ladies Free Game for N****s EP (2023)

Songwriting and production credits
Credits are courtesy of Discogs, Tidal, Apple Music, and AllMusic.

Guest appearances

Awards and nominations

References

African-American songwriters
American rhythm and blues singer-songwriters
Living people
1991 births
Roc Nation artists